Arranged is a 2007 American independent film produced by Cicala Filmworks, directed by Diane Crespo and Stefan Schaefer, and starring Zoe Lister-Jones and Francis Benhamou. It tells the story of the friendship between an Orthodox Jewish woman (Rochel) and a Muslim woman (Nasira), both of whom are teachers in New York City.

Plot
Rochel (who is an Orthodox Jew) and Nasira (who is a Muslim originally from Syria) are young women who are just beginning as teachers in New York's public school system. As Rochel is a teacher for the visually impaired, she meets Nasira (who teaches the fourth grade) as the aid for Eddie (one of Nasira's students). They bond while working together on Eddie's assignments, realizing that they share a lot in common. They also both fight against the stereotypes directed towards them, particularly from Principal Jacoby and Rochel's family.

Both Nasira and Rochel are going through the process of an arranged marriage. Nasira is initially introduced to an older man (a friend of her father), whom she rejects. Her parents then introduce her to a young man her own age whom she likes. The system is different for Rochel, however, who is introduced to young men through the local Shadchan. While Nasira's parents ultimately listened to her frustrations and interests, Rochel's Shadchan only introduces Rochel to young men who fit the Shadchan's set of expectations (while ignoring what Rochel wants). After a few disastrous introductions, Rochel announces that she is stopping the process. She then temporarily leaves home to discuss the matter with her cousin (who has left the Orthodox tradition).

Ultimately, through an accidental meeting with friends of her brother (including an Orthodox Jewish young man), it is Nasira who helps Rochel find someone she likes. The film ends with Nasira and Rochel both married, sitting in the park with their babies in their strollers, talking about their husbands and married life.

Cast
 Zoe Lister-Jones as Rochel Meshenberg
 Francis Benhamou as Nasira Khaldi
 Mimi Lieber as Sheli Meshenberg
 John Rothman as Matan Meshenberg
 Sarah Lord as Naomi Meshenberg
 Trevor Braun as Avi Meshenberg
 Doris Belack as Elona
 Laith Nakli as Abdul-Halim Khaldi
 Jason Liebman as Gideon
 Marcia Jean Kurtz as Principal Jacoby
 Peggy Gormley as Miriam
David Castro as Eddie
Sanjit De Silva as Jamil
 Daniel London as Elliot
Arian Moayed as Ahmed Khaldi
Alysia Reiner as Leah

Release

Accolades
Arranged was the winner of Best Feature Film at the Brooklyn Film Festival and won the Audience Award at the Washington Jewish Film Festival.

Reception

Further reading
"Of Skin and Snoods." The Brooklyn Rail, December 7, 2007 – January 8, 2008.

References

External links 
Official Website

2007 films
2007 drama films
American drama films
American independent films
2000s Arabic-language films
Arranged marriage in fiction
2000s English-language films
Films set in Brooklyn
Films about Orthodox and Hasidic Jews
Films directed by Stefan Schaefer
2000s Hebrew-language films
Islamic and Jewish interfaith dialogue
2007 independent films
2007 multilingual films
American multilingual films
2000s American films